Nightfall was a radio drama series produced and aired by CBC Radio from July 1980 to June 1983.  While primarily a supernatural/horror series, Nightfall featured some episodes in other genres, such as science fiction, mystery, fantasy, and human drama. Some of Nightfalls episodes were so terrifying that the CBC registered numerous complaints and some affiliate stations dropped it. Despite this, the series went on to become one of the most popular shows in CBC Radio history, running 100 episodes that featured a mix of original tales and adaptations of both classic and obscure short stories.

Nightfall was created by producer Bill Howell, who was known at the time for his work on CBC Playhouse and the cult adventure series, Johnny Chase: Secret Agent of Space. When CBC Radio was revamped and given an expanded budget in 1980, Howell approached the newly appointed head of radio drama, Susan Rubeš, about his idea for a supernatural/horror anthology series.  Though not a fan of the horror genre, Rubeš greenlit the production.

Bill Howell served as executive producer of Nightfall at CBC Toronto for the first two seasons. The third season was produced by Don Kowalchuk at CBC Vancouver.

Nightfall featured two hosts during its run. The Toronto years (1980–1982) were hosted by "the mysterious Luther Kranst", a character created by Bill Howell and played by character actor Henry Ramer. For its Vancouver run (1982–1983), Don Kowalchuk worked with voice actor Bill Reiter to develop the character of Frederick Hende.

Production locations and people
Though series production was controlled from a central location, the anthology nature of Nightfall made it possible for episodes to be produced at CBC Radio facilities all over Canada:

CBC TorontoNo. of Episodes: 74Frequent Actors: Elva Mai Hoover, John Stocker, Frank Perry, Sandy Webster, Ruth Springford, Marian Waldman, Neil Dainard, Hugh Webster, Chris Wiggins, Budd Knapp, Michael Wincott, Graham Haley, David Calderisi, Colin Fox, Arch McDonnell, Nicky Guadagni, Neil Munro, Mary Pirie, Linda SorensonRecording Engineers: John Jessop, Ray Folcik, John Hollinger, Jan Wright, David Hoyle, Tom Shipton, Brian Wood, Keith van der Clay, Brian Pape, Derek Stubbs, John McCarthy, Greg FleetSound Effects: Bill Robinson, Matt Wilcott, Kathy Perry, Stephanie McKenna, Jerry FieldingProduction Assistants: Nina Callaghan, Doris Buchanan, Nancy McIlveen, Peggy EsteProducers: Bill Howell, Paul Mills, John Douglas, Stephen Katz, Fred Diehl, Peter Boretski, William Lane, Scott Swan

 CBC VancouverNo. of Episodes: 9Frequent Actors: William Samples, Otto Lowy, Norman Browning, Anna HaganRecording Engineers: Gerry Stanley, Chris Cutress, Gene Loverock, Bill SeebachSound Effects: Joe Silva, Jay Hireen, Chris CutressProduction Assistants: Ann Elvidge, Dagmar Kaffanke, Loretta Joyce, Joyce TinnionProducers: Don Kowalchuk, John Juliani, Robert Chesterman

CBC EdmontonNo. of Episodes: 7Frequent Actors: Brian Taylor, Graham McPherson, Nicole Evans, Gordon Mariott, Bill Meilen, Stephen Walsh, Blair HaynesRecording Engineers: Al LamdenSound Effects: Eric Wagers, Deane PurvesProduction Assistants: Barbara GaultProducers: Lawrie Seligman

CBC MontréalNo. of Episodes: 4Frequent Actors: Vlasta Vrána, Philip Akin, Timothy Webber, Earl PenningtonRecording Engineers: André Fleury, Giles LaRocheSound Effects: Pierre Lucie, Rene LeVoisProduction Assistants: Jane Lewis, Nancy CarterProducers: John Juliani, John Jessop

CBC HalifaxNo. of Episodes: 3Frequent Actors: Joseph Rutten, John FultonRecording Engineers: Rod Sneddon, Keith DeLongSound Effects: Dermot Kenny, Harold PorterProduction Assistants: Claire McIlveenProducers: Elizabeth Fox, Ewan "Sudsy" Clark

CBC CalgaryNo. of Episodes: 1Frequent Actors: David Ferry, Heather Lea McCallumRecording Engineers: Rick FentonSound Effects: Norm HurleyProduction Assistants: Elaine FarnerProducers: Bill Gray

CBC St. JohnsNo. of Episodes: 1Frequent Actors: Frank Holden, Pat VernRecording Engineers: John FosterSound Effects: Wayne HayesProduction Assistants: Noreen GeorgeProducers: Glen Tilley

Clack Sound Studios, NYCNo. of Episodes: 1Frequent Actors: F. Peter LeeRecording Engineers: Tom Courtenay-ClackSound Effects: Tom Courtenay-ClackProduction Assistants: n/aProducers:' Tom Courtenay-Clack

Episode guide

Season One

Season Two

Season Three

References

External links
Internet Archive: Nightfall
OTR Plot Spot: Nightfall - plot summaries and reviews.
Nightfall - Canadian Communication Foundation
The Nightfall Project

1980 radio programme debuts
1983 radio programme endings
Anthology radio series
Canadian radio dramas
CBC Radio One programs
Canadian science fiction radio programs
Horror fiction radio programmes